Chhotte Sahibzade (Punjabi: ਛੋਟੇ ਸਾਹਿਬਜ਼ਾਦੇ ; younger sons of Guru Gobind Singh Ji) attained martyrdom on
26 December 1704 at a very young age of 7 & 5 only. This is known as Saka Sirhind (Punjabi: ਸਾਕਾ ਸਰਹਿੰਦ) or the Chhotte Sahibzada Saka (Punjabi: ਛੋਟੇ ਸਾਹਿਬਜ਼ਾਦੇ ਸਾਕਾ). Every
year on 24 to 26 December, Shaheedi Jor Mela also known as Shaheedi Jor Mel/Sabha is organised at Fatehgarh Sahib Punjab, India, to commemorate the supreme sacrifice at the place of their martyrdom.

Following are series of events related to Saka Sirhind:
 Eviction of Mata Gujri (mother of Guru Gobind Singh), Sahibzada Fateh Singh and Sahibzada Zorawar Singh younger sons of Guru gobind singh ji from Anandpur Sahib siege.
 Arrest of above three at Morinda and hearing at Sirhind.
 innocent appearance at Sirhind Court.
 Nawab Sher Muhammad Khan defended young Sahibzadas Against Injustice by sooba sirhind nawab wajir khan.
 Declaration of Innocence of Sahibzadas, by Qazis and other officials.
 Provocative arguments by Diwan Sucha Nand to support prosecution.
 Found guilty of keeping ideology rebellious to Mughal Government and religions.
 Punishment - Prisoned all 3 on a Open Tower (Thanda Burj) and both sahibjadas bricked alive and throat slit after the bricked wall fell to the ground rendering both the children unconscious. Mata Gujjar kaur also died same day after both sahibjada's martyrs.
 Aftermath

What happened there
Hill rajas and Mughal forces had laid seize to Anandgarh Fort, Anandpur Sahib for about 8 months, in 1704. The Mughals and Hilly Rajas wanted Guru Gobind Singh to leave the fort they swore on Quran and Bhagwat Gita/Gauo Mata to give a safe passage to Guru. The Guru decided to leave the fort on request of panj piaras. Guru Sahib, four Sahibzadas, Mata Gujar kaur, Guru's Mahil (Court and Palace officials including Mata Jeeto Ji, his only wife), five Panj Piaras and a few hundred Sikhs left Anandpur Sahib on the chilly night of 20 December 1704 towards Ropar.  In the intervening night of 20–21 December, the enemy breached the vows and attacked Guru's entourage at a site on Sarsa rivulet some 25 km from Anandpur Sahib. Guru's family separated. This spot is now known as Pariwar Vichhora. Mata Gujar Kaur Ji with two younger grandsons, accompanied Guru family cook, Gangoo, a Kashmiri pandit, to his village, Saheri near Morinda.  Guru's Mahil left with Bhai Mani Singh, towards Delhi. Guru Gobind Singh with two elder Sahibzadas, 5 Panj Piaras and 40 Sikhs proceeded towards Chamkaur and reached there, in the afternoon of 21 December. Both are in Ropar Distt.(Pb.). The famous Chamkaur battle, took place on 22 and 23 December 1704, where two elder Sahibzadas, 3 Panj Piaras and 40 Sikhs laid down their lives fighting 10 lakh Mughal army. Mata Gujar Kaur ji and the two younger Sahibzadas were betrayed by gangoo brahman(kasmiri pandit) for some gold mohurs and were arrested by Morinda Mughals sent by Wazir Khan at Saheri village. From there, they were handed over to Suba Sirhind. They were imprisoned, in the Thanda Burj (Cold Tower). A farcical Trial began, in the Kacheri, (Court) of Suba Sirhind. It lasted for three days. On 26 December 1704, a heinous and cold-blooded crime was committed in the Sarzameen of Sirhind. Guru Gobind Singh's two younger sons, Baba Zorawar Singh and Baba Fateh Singh aged 9 and 6 years were bricked alive and later killed in the presence of the Assembly of Shaitans, presided over by Suba Sirhind, that bloody Wazir Khan. Two younger Sahibzadas and Mata Gujar Kaur (mother of Guru Gobind Singh Ji) were cremated by a merchant Diwan Todar Mal who covered the cremation grounds in gold coins as their final rites couldn't be done on Mughal ground (land), this place is now known as Jyoti Swaroop Gurudwara Sahib at Fatehgarh Sahib Punjab, India.

Samat Bikrmi dates and year: Leaving of Anandpur Sahib, 5 Poh 1761, Battle of Chamkaur 6, 7 and 8 Poh 1761, Saka Sirhind 11,12 and 13 Poh 1761.

See also 
 First Battle of Chamkaur (1702).
 Second Battle of Chamkaur (1704)
 Moti Ram Mehra
 For all in brief

References 
You can read this from here

Read whole story with poetry of Kavi Allah Yar Khan Jogi

1704 in India
Massacres in India
Massacres of Sikhs
History of Punjab, India
Festivals in Punjab, India
Sikh festivals
History of Sikhism
Fatehgarh Sahib district